Lac de Gréziolles is a lake in Hautes-Pyrénées, Pyrénées, France. At an elevation of 2113 m, its surface area is 0.2 km2.

It is accessible by the GR 10 C footpath.

See also 
 Laquet de Gréziolles

External links
 Balade au lac de Greziolles

Lakes of Hautes-Pyrénées